The flag of Australia, also known as the Australian Blue Ensign, is based on the British Blue Ensign—a blue field with the Union Jack in the upper hoist quarter—augmented with a large white seven-pointed star (the Commonwealth Star) and a representation of the Southern Cross constellation, made up of five white stars (one small five-pointed star and four, larger, seven-pointed stars). Australia also has a number of other official flags representing its people and core functions of government.

Its original design (with a six-pointed Commonwealth Star) was chosen in 1901 from entries in a competition held following Federation, and was first flown in Melbourne on 3 September 1901, the date proclaimed in 1996 as Australian National Flag Day. A slightly different design was approved by King Edward VII in 1903. The current seven-pointed Commonwealth Star version was introduced by a proclamation dated 8 December 1908. The dimensions were formally gazetted in 1934, and in 1954 the flag became recognised by, and legally defined in, the Flags Act 1953 as the Australian National Flag.

Design

Devices
The Australian flag uses three prominent symbols: the Southern Cross, the Union Jack and the Commonwealth Star.

In its original usage as the flag of the United Kingdom of Great Britain and Ireland, the Union Flag combined three heraldic crosses which represent the constituent countries of the United Kingdom (as constituted in 1801):
 The red St George's Cross of England
 The white diagonal St Andrew's Cross of Scotland
 The red diagonal St Patrick's Cross of Ireland
The Union Flag is thought to symbolise Australia's history as six British colonies and the principles upon which the Australian Federation is based, although a more historic view sees its inclusion in the design as demonstrating loyalty to the British Empire.

The Commonwealth Star, also known as the Federation Star, originally had six points, representing the six federating colonies. In 1908, a seventh point was added to symbolise the Territory of Papua, and any future territories. Another rationale for the change was to match the star used on the Coat of Arms, which was created in the same year. The Commonwealth Star does not have any official relation to Beta Centauri, despite the latter's brightness and location in the sky; however, the 1870 version of the flag of South Australia featured the "pointer" stars, Alpha and Beta Centauri.

The Southern Cross is one of the most distinctive constellations visible in the Southern Hemisphere, and has been used to represent Australia since the early days of British settlement. Ivor Evans, one of the flag's designers, intended the Southern Cross to also refer to the four moral virtues ascribed to the four main stars by Dante: justice, prudence, temperance and fortitude. The number of points on the stars of the Southern Cross on the modern Australian flag differs from the original competition-winning design, in which they ranged between five and nine points each, representing their relative brightness in the night sky. The stars are named after the first five letters of the Greek alphabet, in decreasing order of brightness in the sky. In order to simplify manufacture, the British Admiralty standardised the four larger outer stars at seven points each, leaving the smaller, more central star with five points. This change was officially gazetted on 23 February 1903.

A complete specification for the official design was published in the Commonwealth Gazette in 1934.

Colours
The colours of the flag, although not specified by the Flags Act, have been given Pantone specifications by the Awards and Culture Branch of the Department of the Prime Minister and Cabinet. The Australian Government's Style Manual for Authors, Editors and Printers also gives CMYK and RGB specifications for depicting the flag in print and on screen respectively.

The blue shade also has a web-safe colour of #000099, used for certain digital screens that may have trouble displaying the shade of blue in the table above. The flag may be reproduced in a single colour, with the colour being either black or one of the two colours of the flag, albeit blue is generally preferred for single-colour productions.

The red colour in the ensign part of the Australian flag (Pantone 185C, Hex: #FF0000) is actually a shade lighter than the British flag (Pantone 186C, Hex: #C8102E) from which it originated. The blue colour has a different hex code for RGB scheme, but when printed -the Pantone number- it is the same: Australia (Pantone 280C, Hex: 00008B) vs. United Kingdom (Pantone 280C, Hex: 012169).

Construction

Under the Flags Act, the Australian National Flag must meet the following specifications:

 the Union Flag occupying the upper quarter (canton) next to the staff;
 a large seven-pointed white star (six representing the six states of Australia and one representing the territories) in the centre of the lower quarter next to the staff and pointing direct to the centre of St George's Cross in the Union Flag;
 five white stars (representing the Southern Cross) in the half of the flag further from the staff.
The location of the stars is as follows:
 Commonwealth Star – 7-pointed star, centred in lower hoist.
Alpha Crucis – 7-pointed star, straight below centre fly  up from bottom edge.
Beta Crucis – 7-pointed star,  of the way left and  up from the centre fly.
Gamma Crucis – 7-pointed star, straight above centre fly  down from top edge.
Delta Crucis – 7-pointed star,  of the way right and  up from the centre fly.
Epsilon Crucis – 5-pointed star,  of the way right and  down from the centre fly.

The flag's width is the measurement of the hoist edge of the flag (the distance from top to bottom).

Protocol 

Guidelines for flying the flag are laid out in the 1953 Flags Act and in a pamphlet entitled "The Australian National Flag", which is infrequently published by the Australian Government. The guidelines say that the Australian National Flag is allowed to be flown on every day of the year, and that it "should be treated with respect and dignity it deserves as the nation's most important national symbol".

The National Flag must always be flown in a position superior to that of any other flag or ensign when flown in Australia or on Australian territory, and it should always be flown aloft and free. The flag must be flown in all government buildings and displayed in polling stations when there is a national election or referendum. Private pleasure craft can fly either the Red Ensign or the Australian National Flag. The British Blue Ensign can be flown on an Australian owned ship instead of the Australian Flag if the owner has a warrant valid under British law.

The Department of the Prime Minister and Cabinet also advises that the flag should only be flown during daylight hours, unless it is illuminated. Two flags should not be flown from the same flagpole. The flag should not be displayed upside down under any circumstances, not even to express a situation of distress. The flag is not to be placed or dropped on the ground, nor should it be used to cover an object in the lead-up to an unveiling ceremony, or to hide other material. Flags that have decayed or faded should not be displayed.

According to a government publication, old or decayed flags should be disposed of in private "in a dignified way"; a method given as an example is to cut the flag into small pieces before being placed in the waste.

When the flag is flown at half-mast, it should be recognisably at half-mastfor example, a third of the way down from the top of the pole. The Australian Flag should never be flown half mast at night. Flags are flown at half-mast on government buildings:
 On the death of the sovereign – from the time of announcement of the death up to and including the funeral. On the day the accession of the new sovereign is proclaimed, it is customary to raise the flag to the top of the mast from 11 am.
 On the death of a member of the royal family.
 On the death of the governor-general or a former governor-general.
 On the death of a distinguished Australian citizen. Flags in any locality may be flown at half-mast on the death of a notable local citizen or on the day, or part of the day, of their funeral.
 On the death of the head of state of another country with which Australia has diplomatic relations—the flag would be flown on the day of the funeral.
 On ANZAC Day the flag is flown at half-mast until noon.
 On Remembrance Day flags are flown at peak until 10:30 am, at half-mast from 10:30 am to 11:03 am, then at peak for the remainder of the day.

The department provides a subscription-based email service called the Commonwealth Flag Network, which gives information on national occasions to fly the flag at half-mast as well as national days of commemoration and celebration of the flag.

The Australian National Flag may be used for commercial or advertising purposes without formal permission as long as the flag is used in a dignified manner and reproduced completely and accurately; it should not be defaced by overprinting with words or illustrations, it should not be covered by other objects in displays, and all symbolic parts of the flag should be identifiable. It also must sit first (typically, left) where more than one flag is used. For this reason the Collingwood Football Club had to reverse its logo, which previously featured the flag until a logo refresh at the end of 2017.

There have been several attempts to make desecration of the Australian flag a crime. In 1953, during the second reading debate on the Flags Act, the leader of the Opposition, Arthur Calwell, unsuccessfully called for provisions to be added to the bill to criminalise desecration. Michael Cobb introduced private member's bills in 1989, 1990, 1991 and 1992 to ban desecration, but on each occasion the bill lapsed. In 2002, the leader of the National Party, John Anderson, proposed to introduce laws banning desecration of the Australian flag, a call that attracted support from some parliamentarians both in his own party and the senior Coalition partner, the Liberal Party. The Prime Minister, John Howard, rejected the calls, stating that "...in the end I guess it's part of the sort of free speech code that we have in this country". In 2003, the Australian Flags (Desecration of the Flag) Bill was tabled in Parliament by Trish Draper without support from Howard and subsequently lapsed. In 2006, following a flag-burning incident during the 2005 Cronulla riots and a burnt flag display by a Melbourne artist, Liberal MP Bronwyn Bishop introduced the Protection of the Australian National Flag (Desecration of the Flag) Bill 2006. This bill sought to make it "a criminal offence to wilfully destroy or otherwise mutilate the Flag in circumstances where a reasonable person would infer that the destruction or mutilation is intended publicly to express contempt or disrespect for the Flag or the Australian Nation." The bill received a second reading but subsequently lapsed and did not go to vote in the House of Representatives.

History
The Union Flag, as the flag of the British Empire, was first used on Australian soil on 29 April 1770 when Lieutenant James Cook landed at Botany Bay. Following the arrival of the First Fleet, Captain Arthur Phillip established a convict settlement at Sydney Cove on 26 January 1788. He first raised the Union Flag on 7 February 1788 when he proclaimed the Colony of New South Wales. 

The Union Flag at that stage was the one introduced in 1606, which did not include the Saint Patrick's Saltire; it was included from 1801 after the Acts of Union 1801. The second version post-1801 is depicted on the Australian Flag.  It was often used to represent them collectively, and each colony also had its own flag based on the Union Flag. As an Australian national consciousness began to emerge, several flag movements were formed and unofficial new flags came into common usage. Two attempts were made throughout the nineteenth century to design a national flag. The first such attempt was the National Colonial Flag created in 1823–1824 by Captains John Nicholson and John Bingle. This flag consisted of a red cross on a white background, with an eight-point star on each of the four limbs of the cross, while incorporating a Union Flag in the canton. The most popular "national" flag of the period was the 1831 Federation Flag, also designed by Nicholson. This flag was the same at the National Colonial Flag, except that the cross was blue instead of resembling that of St. George. Although the flag was designed by Nicholson in 1831, it did not become widely popular until the latter part of the century, when calls for federation began to grow louder. These flags, and many others such as the Eureka Flag (which came into use at the Eureka Stockade in 1854), featured stars representing the Southern Cross. The oldest known flag to show the stars arranged as they are seen in the sky is the Anti-Transportation League Flag, which is similar in design to the present National Flag. The differences were that there was no Commonwealth Star, while the components of the Southern Cross are depicted with eight points and in gold. This flag was only briefly in usage, as two years after the formation of the Anti-Transportation League in 1851, the colonial authorities decided to stop the intake of convicts, so the ATL ceased its activities. The Eureka Flag has become an enduring symbol in Australian culture and has been used by various groups and movements. The Murray River Flag, popular since the 1850s, is still widely used by boats that traverse Australia's main waterway. It is the same as the National Colonial Flag, except that the white background in the three quadrants other the canton were replaced with four alternating blue and white stripes, representing the four major rivers that run into the Murray River.

1901 Federal Flag Design Competition

As Federation approached, thoughts turned to an official federal flag. In 1900, the Melbourne Herald conducted a design competition with a prize of 25 Australian pounds (A$4,400 in 2021 terms) in which entries were required to include the Union Flag and Southern Cross, resulting in a British Ensign–style flag. The competition conducted by the Review of Reviews for Australasia—a Melbourne-based publication—later that year thought such a restriction seemed unwise, despite observing that designs without these emblems were unlikely to be successful; nonetheless, it suggested that entries incorporate the two elements in their design. After Federation on 1 January 1901, and following receipt of a request from the British government to design a new flag, the new Commonwealth Government held an official competition for a new federal flag in April. The competition attracted 32,823 entries, including those originally sent to the Review of Reviews. One of these was submitted by an unnamed governor of a colony. The two contests were merged after the Review of Reviews agreed to being integrated into the government initiative. The £75 prize money of each competition were combined and augmented by a further £50 donated by Havelock Tobacco Company. Each competitor was required to submit two coloured sketches, a red ensign for the merchant service and public use, and a blue ensign for naval and official use. The designs were judged on seven criteria: loyalty to the Empire, Federation, history, heraldry, distinctiveness, utility and cost of manufacture. The majority of designs incorporated the Union Flag and the Southern Cross, but native animals were also popular, including one that depicted a variety of indigenous animals playing cricket. The entries were put on display at the Royal Exhibition Building in Melbourne and the judges took six days to deliberate before reaching their conclusion. Five almost identical entries were chosen as the winning design, and the designers shared the £200 (2021: $35,200) prize money. They were Ivor Evans, a fourteen-year-old schoolboy from Melbourne; Leslie John Hawkins, a teenager apprenticed to an optician from Sydney; Egbert John Nuttall, an architect from Melbourne; Annie Dorrington, an artist from Perth; and William Stevens, a ship's officer from Auckland, New Zealand. The five winners received £40 each. The differences to the current flag were the six-pointed Commonwealth Star, while the components stars in the Southern Cross had different numbers of points, with more if the real star was brighter. This led to five stars of nine, eight, seven, six and five points respectively.

The flag's initial reception was mixed. Readers of The Age newspaper were told that:

"a huge Blue Ensign with the prize design of the Southern Cross and a six pointed star thereon was run up to the top of the flagstaff on the dome and breaking, streamed out on the heavy south-westerly breeze, a brave and inspiring picture."

The report carried by the Argus newspaper was also celebratory in nature, stating:

"In years to come the flag which floated yesterday in the Exhibition building over Her Excellency the Countess of Hopetoun, who stood for Great Britain, and the Prime Minister (Mr Barton), who stood for Australia, will, in all human probability, become the emblem upon which the millions of the free people of the Commonwealth will gaze with a thrill of national pride."

Alternatively, the then republican magazine The Bulletin labelled it:
a staled réchauffé of the British flag, with no artistic virtue, no national significance... Minds move slowly: and Australia is still Britain's little boy. What more natural than that he should accept his father's cut-down garments, – lacking the power to protest, and only dimly realising his will. That bastard flag is a true symbol of the bastard state of Australian opinion.
As the design was basically the Victorian flag with a star added, many critics in both the Federal Government and the New South Wales government objected to the chosen flag for being "too Victorian". They wanted the Australian Federation Flag, and Prime Minister Barton, who had been promoting the Federation Flag, submitted this flag along with that chosen by the judges to the Admiralty for final approval. The Admiralty chose the Red for private vessels and Blue Ensigns for government ships. The Barton government regarded both the Blue and Red Ensigns as colonial maritime flags and "grudgingly" agreed to fly it only on naval ships. Later governments, that of Chris Watson in 1904 and Andrew Fisher in 1910, were also unhappy with the design, wanting something "more 

distinctive" and more "indicative of Australian unity."

On 3 September 1901, the new Australian flag flew for the first time from the dome of the Royal Exhibition Building in Melbourne. The names of the joint winners of the design competition were announced by Hersey, Countess of Hopetoun (the wife of the Governor-General, the 7th Earl of Hopetoun) and she unfurled the flag for the first time. Since 1996 this date has been officially known as Australian National Flag Day.

The competition-winning designs were submitted to the British Colonial Secretary in 1902.  Prime Minister Edmund Barton announced in the Commonwealth Gazette that King Edward VII had officially approved the design as the flag of Australia on 11 February 1903. The published version made all the stars in the Southern Cross seven-pointed apart from the smallest, and is the same as the current design except the six-pointed Commonwealth Star.

Blue versus red ensign
In the decades following federation the red ensign was also the preeminent flag in use by private citizens on land. This was largely due to the Commonwealth government, assisted by flag suppliers, discouraging use of the blue ensign, now known as the Australian National Flag, by the general public. Both the blue and red versions were used by armed forces during the First and Second World Wars. A colourised version of a photograph held by the Australian War Memorial of the Armistice Day celebrations in Sydney's Martin Place, 11 November 1918, reveals both ensigns being displayed by the assembled crowd. Illustrations and photos of the opening of Australia's provisional Parliament House in 1927 show Australian Ensigns flown alongside Union Flags. However, sources disagree on the colours of the Australian flags, leaving open the possibility that either ensign or both were used. A memo from the Prime Minister's Department dated 6 March 1939 states that: "the Red Ensign is the flag to be flown by the public generally" and the federal government policy was "The flying of the Commonwealth Blue Ensign is reserved for Commonwealth Government use but there is no reservation in the case of the Commonwealth Merchant Flag, or Red Ensign".

In the 1940s, the federal government began to encourage public use of the blue ensign. Despite this, there remained confusion until the Flags Act 1953 declared the Blue Ensign to be the national flag and the Red Ensign the flag of the Australian mercantile marine. It has been claimed that this choice was made on the basis that the predominately red version carried too many communist overtones for the government of the day to be legislated for as the chief national symbol, although no cabinet documents yet released to the public including the more detailed minutes have ever been adduced in support of this theory. The Red Ensign continues to be paraded on Anzac Day in recognition of its historical significance.

Technically, private non-commercial vessels were liable to a substantial fine if they did not fly the British Red Ensign. However, an Admiralty Warrant was issued on 5 December 1938, authorising these vessels to fly the Australian Red Ensign.

As a result of the declaration of 3 September as Merchant Navy Day in 2008, the Red Ensign can be flown on land alongside the Australian national flag on this occasion as a matter of protocol.

Status of the Union Jack

The Blue Ensign replaced the Union Jack at the Olympic Games at St Louis in 1904. In the same year, due to lobbying by Richard Crouch MP, it had the same status as the Union Flag in the UK, when the House of Representatives proclaimed that the Blue Ensign "should be flown upon all forts, vessels, saluting places and public buildings of the Commonwealth upon all occasions when flags are used". The government agreed to fly the Blue Ensign on special flag days, but not if it meant additional expense, which undermined the motion. The Blue Ensign could only be flown on a state government building if a state flag was not available.

On 2 June 1904 a resolution was passed by parliament to replace the Union Jack with the "Australian Flag" on forts. Initially the Department of Defence resisted using the Flag, considering it to be a marine ensign and favouring King's Regulations that specified the use of the Union Jack. After being approached by the Department of Defence, Prime Minister Chris Watson stated in parliament that he was not satisfied with the design of the Australian flag and that implementation of the 1904 resolution could wait until consideration was given to "adopt another [flag] which in our opinion is more appropriate." In 1908, Australian Army Military Order, No 58/08 ordered the "Australian Ensign" replace the Union Flag at all military establishments. From 1911 it was the saluting flag of the Australian army at all reviews and ceremonial parades,

The Royal Australian Navy (RAN) was promulgated on 5 October 1911 and was directed to fly the British White Ensign on the stern and the flag of Australia on the Jackstaff. Despite the government wanting to use the Blue Ensign on Australian warships, officers continued to fly the Union Flag, and it was not until 1913, following public protest in Fremantle after its use for the review of HMAS Melbourne, that the government "reminded" them of the 1911 legislation. The British White Ensign was finally replaced by a distinctively Australian White Ensign on 1 March 1967 (see Flags of the Australian Defence Force).

Despite the new Australian Flags official use, from 1901 until the 1920s the Federation Flag remained the most popular Australian flag for public and even some official events. It was flown at the 1907 State Premiers conference in Melbourne and during the 1927 visit to Australia of the Duke and Duchess of York, the future King George VI and Queen Elizabeth.

In the 1920s there was debate over whether the Blue Ensign was reserved for Commonwealth buildings only, culminating in a 1924 agreement that the Union Flag should take precedence as the National Flag with state and local governments henceforth able to use the blue ensign. As the Union Flag was recognised as the National flag, it was considered disloyal to fly either ensign without the Union flag alongside, and it was the Union Flag that covered the coffins of Australia's war dead.

In 1940 the Victorian government passed legislation allowing schools to purchase Blue Ensigns, which in turn allowed its use by private citizens. Prime Minister Robert Menzies then recommended schools, government building and private citizens to use the Blue Ensign, issuing a statement the following year allowing Australians to use either ensign providing it was done so respectfully.

Prime Minister Ben Chifley issued a similar statement in 1947.

On 4 December 1950, the Prime Minister Robert Menzies affirmed the Blue ensign as the National flag and in 1951 King George VI approved the Government's recommendation.

When the Flags Bill was introduced into parliament on 20 November 1953, Menzies said:"This bill is very largely a formal measure which puts into legislative form what has become almost the established practice in Australia ... The design adopted was submitted to His Majesty King Edward VII, and he was pleased to approve of it as the Australian flag in 1902. However, no legislative action has ever been taken to determine the precise form of the flag or the circumstances of its use, and this bill has been brought down to produce that result."This status was formalised on 14 February 1954, when Queen Elizabeth II gave Royal Assent to the Flags Act 1953, which had been passed two months earlier. The monarch's Assent was timed to coincide with the Queen's visit to the country and came after she had opened the new session of Parliament. The Act confers statutory powers on the Governor-General to appoint 'flags and ensigns of Australia' and authorise warrants and make rules as to use of flags. Section 8 ensures that the 'right or privilege' of a person to fly the Union Flag is not affected by the Act.

South Australia chose to continue with the Union Flag as National flag until 1956, when schools were given the option of using either the Union or Australian flags. The Union Flag was still regarded as the National flag by many Australians well into the 1970s, which inspired Arthur Smout's campaign from 1968 to 1982 to encourage Australians to give the Australian flag precedence.

By the mid-1980s, the Commonwealth Government no longer reminded Australians they had the right to fly the Union Flag alongside the National Flag or provided illustrations of how to correctly display them together.

Flag Day

In 1996, the Governor-General, Sir William Deane, issued a proclamation recognising the annual commemoration of Australian National Flag Day, to be held on 3 September. Flag Day celebrations had been occurring in Sydney since 1985. The inaugural event was held under the auspices of the New South Wales branch of the Australian National Flag Association to commemorate the anniversary of the flag being first flown in 1901. On Flag Day, ceremonies are held in schools, major centres, and the Governor-General, Governors and some politicians attend or release statements to the media. Australian National Flag Day is not a public holiday.

Centenary flags

Centenary flag of state

On the centenary of the first flying of the flag, 3 September 2001, the Australian National Flag Association presented the Prime Minister with a flag intended to replace the missing original flag. This flag was not a replica of the original flag, on which the Commonwealth Star had only six points, but was a current Australian National Flag with a seven pointed Commonwealth Star. The flag has a special headband, including a cardinal red stripe and the inscription
The Centenary Flag. Presented to the Hon John Howard MP, Prime Minister of Australia on behalf of the people of Australia by the Australian National Flag Association on 3 September 2001 at the Royal Exhibition Building, Melbourne to commemorate the first flying of the Australian National Flag on 3 September 1901 attended by the Rt Hon Sir Edmund Barton MHR, Prime Minister of Australia.
A warrant authorising the use of the Centenary Flag under section 6 of the Flags Act was issued by the Governor-General and the flag is now used as the official flag of state on important occasions. These included the opening of new parliamentary terms and when visiting heads of state arrive. The flag has been transported across the country for flying in every state and territory. It was later used on Remembrance Day in 2003 for the opening of the Australian War Memorial in Hyde Park in London.

Parliament house centenary flag

On 18 September 2001 during the centenary of federation the federal member for Hinkler, Paul Neville, would request of the speaker that:

"before it [the flag] becomes too faded or too tattered, [it] be taken down and perhaps offered to a museum or an art gallery as the seminal flag that flew over this building 100 years from the time the first flag was flown?"

The parliament house centenary flag was subsequently entrusted to the Australian Flag Society and has been paraded at schools to mark Australian National Flag Day on a tour of the Australian Capital Territory, New South Wales and Queensland.

Other Australian flags

Under Section 5 of the Flags Act 1953, the Governor-General may proclaim flags other than the National Flag and the Red Ensign as flags or ensigns of Australia. Five flags have been appointed in this manner. The first two were the Royal Australian Navy Ensign and the Royal Australian Air Force Ensign, the flags used by the Royal Australian Navy and the Royal Australian Air Force. The Australian Army has no ensign of its own, but they are given the ceremonial task to be the defender of the National Flag. The Air Force and the Navy flew the appropriate British ensigns (the White Ensign and the Royal Air Force Ensign) until the adoption of similar ensigns based on the Australian National Flag in 1948 and 1967 respectively. The current Navy and Air Force Ensigns were officially appointed in 1967 and 1982 respectively.

The Queen's Personal Australian Flag was approved by Her Majesty Queen Elizabeth II on 20 September 1962, and was only flown only when she visited Australia, most recently in 2011. It was used in a similar way as the Royal Standard of the United Kingdom.

In 1995, the Aboriginal Flag and the Torres Strait Islander Flag were also appointed flags of Australia. While mainly seen as a gesture of reconciliation, this recognition caused a small amount of controversy at the time, with then opposition leader John Howard describing it as divisive. Some Indigenous people, such as the flag's designer Harold Thomas, felt that the government was appropriating their flag, saying it "doesn't need any more recognition".

The Australian Defence Force Ensign was proclaimed in 2000. This flag is used to represent the Defence Force when more than one branch of the military is involved, such as at the Australian Defence Force Academy, and by the Minister for Defence.

The Legislative Instruments Act 2003 required the proclamations of these flags to be lodged in a Federal Register. Due to an administrative oversight they were not, and the proclamations were automatically repealed. The Governor-General of Australia issued new proclamations dated 25 January 2008, with effect from 1 January 2008 (or 1 October 2006 in the case of the Defence Force Ensign).

In addition to the seven flags declared under the Flags Act, there are two additional Commonwealth flags, the Australian Civil Aviation Ensign and Australian Customs Flag, eight Vice-Regal flags and nine state and territory flags that are recognised as official flags through other means.

Flag debate

There have been mild but persistent debates over whether or not the Union Flag should be removed from the canton of the Australian flag. This debate has culminated on several occasions, such as the period preceding the Australian Bicentenary in 1988, and during the Prime Ministership of Paul Keating, who publicly supported a change in the flag, saying "I do not believe that the symbols and the expression of the full sovereignty of Australian nationhood can ever be complete while we have a flag with the flag of another country on the corner of it."

There are two lobby groups involved in the flag debate: Ausflag (est. 1981), which supports changing the flag, and the Australian National Flag Association (ANFA) (est. 1983), which wants to keep the existing flag. The primary arguments for keeping the flag cite historic precedence, while those for changing the flag are based around the idea that the status quo does not accurately depict Australia's status as an independent and multicultural nation, nor is its design unique enough to easily distinguish it from similar flags, such as the flags of New Zealand, Cook Islands and Tuvalu (despite the counter argument that this is not uncommon, as seen with Romania and Chad sharing near identical flags). The similarity between the flag of Australia and those of other countries is often derived from a common colonial history.

The Coalition government under John Howard in 1996 formally recognised the commemoration of Australian National Flag Day; in 1998 sponsored an amendment to the Flags Act to require any changes to the national flag design to be passed at a plebiscite along the same lines of the 1977 national song poll; in 2002 supplied ANFA's promotional video free to all primary schools; and in 2004 required all schools receiving federal funds to fly the Australian flag.

Ausflag periodically campaigns for flag change in association with national events such as the 2000 Summer Olympics, and holds flag design competitions, while ANFA's activities include promotion of the existing flag through events such as National Flag Day. On Australia Day in 2018, Ausflag released an alternative design of the flag without the Union Jack, featuring a Commonwealth Star and Southern Cross. The date of the release was met with some backlash, which Harold Scruby, Ausflag's executive director called "the lowest form of censorship." Following the release, Malcolm Turnbull, then-prime minister and a former Ausflag director, told the group that the flag would never change, viewing it as an important symbol of Australian history.

A 2004 Newspoll that asked: "Are you personally in favour or against changing the Australian flag so as to remove the Union Jack emblem?" was supported by 32% of respondents and opposed by 57%, with 11% uncommitted. A 2010 Morgan Poll that asked: "Do you think Australia should have a new design for our National Flag?" was supported by 29% of respondents and opposed by 66%, with 5% uncommitted. A 2013 survey found that 95 per cent of surveyed adults stated that they took pride in the national flag, which was enjoying increasing popularity; half (50%) said they were extremely proud.

See also

 Historical flags of the British Empire and the overseas territories
 Flag of Fiji
 Flag of New Zealand
 Flag of Tuvalu
 Flags depicting the Southern Cross

Notes

References

External links

Australian National Flag  (Department of the Prime Minister and Cabinet)

Review of Reviews for Australasia, 20 September 1901 – includes the Federal Flag Competition

Australia
Australia
National symbols of Australia
Australia
 
Australia
Southern Cross flags
1908 establishments in Australia